Ram Cat Alley Historic District is a national historic district located at Seneca, Oconee County, South Carolina. It encompasses 18 contributing buildings in the central business district of Seneca. They were built between about 1887 and 1930.  Notable buildings include the Patterson Building, Harper and Jones Building, C. F. Adams General Store, Old Seneca Post Office, and Richardson Theatre.

It was added to the National Register of Historic Places in 2000. The application was compiled and submitted by Chris Knopf, a Clemson University Graduate Student, and Walter Scharer, then Planning Director for Seneca, South Carolina. Knopf is now County Manager for Surry County, North Carolina, and Scharer is Planning Director for Shelby, North Carolina.

References

Commercial buildings on the National Register of Historic Places in South Carolina
Historic districts on the National Register of Historic Places in South Carolina
Buildings and structures in Oconee County, South Carolina
National Register of Historic Places in Oconee County, South Carolina
Seneca, South Carolina